During the 2022 Russian invasion of Ukraine, national parliaments including those of Poland, Ukraine, Canada, Estonia, Latvia, Lithuania and the Republic of Ireland declared that genocide was taking place. Scholars of genocide, including Eugene Finkel, Timothy D. Snyder and Gregory Stanton; legal experts  Zakhar Tropin; and a comprehensive report by the Raoul Wallenberg Centre for Human Rights claimed that along with the acts required by the definition of genocide, there was genocidal intent, together establishing genocide. 

Human rights lawyer Juan E. Méndez stated on 4 March 2022 that the genocide claim was worth investigating, but should not be presumed; and genocide scholar Alexander Hinton stated on 13 April that Russian president Vladimir Putin's genocidal rhetoric would have to be linked to the war crimes in order to establish genocidal intent, but it is "quite likely" that Russia is committing genocide in Ukraine. War crimes committed by Russian forces include sexual violence, torture, extrajudicial killings and looting. There has also been a coordinated campaign to abduct Ukrainian children and deport them to Russia for adoption. Per the Russian Ministry of Defense, over 307,000 children were forcibly transferred to Russia from 24 February 2022, to 18 June 2022, alone.

Background

Legal definition of genocide 
Under the 1948 Genocide Convention, genocide requires both genocidal intent ("intent to destroy, in whole or in part") and acts carried out to destroy "a national, ethnic, racial or religious group" with that intent; the acts can be any of:
Punishable acts include genocide and also complicity in and attempts, conspiracy, or incitement to commit genocide, and parties to the convention have an obligation to prevent and suppress them.

War crimes in the 2022 Russian invasion of Ukraine 

The human rights organizations Amnesty International and Human Rights Watch recorded mass cases of crimes by the Russian Armed Forces against civilians during the 2022 Russian invasion of Ukraine, including torture, executions, rape and looting. After the Bucha massacre, Agnès Callamard, Secretary General of Amnesty International, said that crimes committed "are not isolated incidents and are likely part of an even larger pattern of war crimes, including extrajudicial executions, torture and rape in other occupied regions of Ukraine." 

According to Dr. Jack Watling of the Royal Joint Institute for Defense Studies, these actions are part of the Russian doctrine of anti-guerrilla warfare. Its goal is "to take revenge on the population for the audacity to resist." Watling noted that similar tactics were used in the Second Chechen War, in the Afghanistan conflict, and during World War II.

The organized nature of the killings of civilians was reported by representatives of the intelligence communities of the United Kingdom and Germany. The head of British intelligence MI6, Richard Moore, in connection with the killings in Bucha, noted: "We knew that Putin's plans for the invasion included extrajudicial executions by the military and special services."

On 7 April, German magazine Der Spiegel published data from a German intelligence report to the Bundestag produced on 6 April. According to the data of radio interceptions voiced by the parliamentarians, Russian military personnel carried out killings of civilians and executions of Ukrainian prisoners of war after they underwent an interrogation. What was described in them corresponded to the location of the bodies found in Bucha. Der Spiegel came to the conclusion that they showed that the massacres were neither random actions nor grassroots initiative of some military. Much more likely, these materials indicate that the killings of civilians could be part of a "clear strategy" to "intimidate the civilian population and suppress resistance."

The International Federation for Human Rights and its affiliate in Ukraine, the Center for Civil Liberties (CSF), reported evidence of the forcible transfer of civilians by the Russian military from the besieged Mariupol to Russia, and the Donetsk and Luhansk oblasts, and Crimea using filtration camps. According to the CSF, families were separated, and documents and phones were confiscated. According to the CSF, Russian forces also prevented civilians from passing through humanitarian corridors to the non-occupied parts of Ukraine, opening fire on them. According to Ukrainian officials, the same practice was used by Russian troops in Sumy, Kharkiv and Kyiv.

The director of Amnesty International Ukraine, in an interview with Deutsche Welle on 4 April 2022, accused Russia of using targeted tactics to deplete the civilian population in besieged cities (deliberately cutting off access to food, water, electricity, and heat supply) and bringing them to a humanitarian catastrophe. There were noted cases of blocking humanitarian corridors, shelling of buses, killing of civilians who tried to leave the besieged cities.

On 20 August 2022, the permanent representative of the Russian Federation to international organizations in Vienna, Mikhail Ulyanov, in response to the post of thanks to the President of Ukraine, Volodymyr Zelenskyy, for the new package of military aid from the United States, published a post on Twitter calling on the Ukrainian population not to be spared. Later, Ulyanov deleted his post. The Chairman of the Verkhovna Rada of Ukraine Ruslan Stefanchuk appealed to President of Austria Alexander Van der Bellen and Chancellor Karl Nehammer demanding to recognize Mikhail Ulyanov as persona non grata and to deport him to the Russian Federation due to his genocidal calls.

Legislative recognition 

On 23 March 2022, the Sejm of Poland adopted a resolution on the commission by Russia of war crimes, crimes against humanity, and violations of human rights on the territory of Ukraine. In accordance with the resolution, Poland condemned acts of genocide and other violations of international law committed by Russian troops on the territory of Ukraine. The resolution states that these crimes were committed "on the orders of the military commander-in-chief President Vladimir Putin".

On 14 April 2022, the Verkhovna Rada of Ukraine adopted a resolution, "On the commission of genocide in Ukraine by the Russian Federation", in which the actions of the Russian troops and the Russian leadership in Ukraine are recognized as genocide of the Ukrainian people. In accordance with the statement of the Rada on the resolution, acts of genocide by Russia included:

 mass atrocities committed by Russian troops in the temporarily occupied territories
 systematic cases of the deliberate killing of civilians
 mass deportations of the civilian population
 the transfer of displaced Ukrainian children into the education system of the Russian Federation
 seizure and targeted destruction of economic infrastructure facilities
 systemic actions of the Russian Federation, designed for the gradual destruction of the Ukrainian people
In June 2022, a bipartisan group in the United States Congress introduced a resolution characterizing Russian actions in Ukraine as genocide, and in July the US Senate did so, but neither has been agreed .

List of countries, which recognize the ongoing events in Ukraine as genocide:
 
  (indirect recognition)

Statements by officials and organizations 

Days after the discovery of evidence of the Bucha massacre, Ukrainian President Volodymyr Zelenskyy declared that Ukraine was experiencing an attempted genocide. Polish President Andrzej Duda, Prime Minister of Poland Mateusz Morawiecki, Prime Minister of Spain Pedro Sanchez, Colombian President Iván Duque, American President Joe Biden, and Prime Minister of Canada Justin Trudeau also assessed the situation in Ukraine as a genocide. British Prime Minister Boris Johnson said that "the atrocities in Bucha are not far from genocide."

On 13 April 2022, French President Emmanuel Macron said he wanted to be "careful with terms", questioning the usefulness of the "escalation of words" to end the war, specifying that "Russia unilaterally launched a brutal war, and it is now established that war crimes were committed by the Russian army." Zelenskyy criticized Macron's characterization.

The All-Ukrainian Council of Churches and Religious Organizations called on every state in the world to recognize the genocide of the Ukrainian people during the 2022 Russian invasion and condemn the ideology of the "Russian world".

Numerous other state leaders and officials have made statements about the issue.

Genocide Watch, a Washington, D.C. based non-governmental organization founded by Gregory Stanton, issued a Genocide Emergency Alert in April 2022 - accusing Russia of committing genocide against Ukrainians via a policy of "urbicide".

Investigations

In early March 2022, the Chief Prosecutor of the International Criminal Court, Karim Ahmad Khan, after obtaining formal referrals from 39 countries, started the phase of a full investigation of war crimes, and crimes against humanity or genocide in Ukraine "by any person" since November 2013. Prior to 2022, the preliminary examination had found "reasonable grounds for believing that crimes within the jurisdiction of the court have been committed" and "identified potential cases that would be admissible."

On 4 March 2022 the UN Human Rights Council created an Independent International Commission of Inquiry on Ukraine into violations of human rights and of international humanitarian law. Other investigations of war crimes were also carried out separately under universal jurisdiction, the intiators of which were independent states.

In November 2022, Ukraine's Prosecutor General Andriy Kostin said that during the course of five proceedings on genocide by law enforcement, investigators had recorded "more than 300 facts that belong precisely to the definition of genocide".

Assessments 

On 27 May 2022, a report by New Lines Institute for Strategy and Policy and Raoul Wallenberg Centre for Human Rights concluded that there were reasonable grounds to conclude that Russia breached two articles of the 1948 Genocide Convention, by publicly inciting genocide through denial of the right of Ukraine as a state and Ukrainians as a nation to exist, and by the forcible transfer of Ukrainian children to Russia, which is a genocidal act under article II of the convention. A Foreign Policy article acknowledged that Vladimir Putin's goal was to "erase Ukraine as a political and national entity and to Russify its inhabitants", meaning the report serves as a warning that Russia's war could become genocide.

On 23 August 2022, an assessment by the Institute for the Study of War mentions that Ukrainian children are being adopted by Russian families and considers that "the forcible transfer of children from one group to another with intent to destroy, in whole or in part, a national, ethnic, racial or religious group is a violation of the Convention on the Prevention and Punishment of the Crime of Genocide". On 30 August it reported that Russia is establishing "adaptation centres" for displaced Ukrainians in Russia, including those there involuntarily, likely setting conditions to erase their Ukrainian cultural identity and forming part of a campaign of population transfer.

Claims that it is too early to call it genocide 

Aisling Reidy, a senior legal adviser at Human Rights Watch, commented to Deutsche Welle on 3 April 2022, that in Bucha, "there are certainly war crimes, potentially crimes against humanity, where we see civilians being killed, and clearly being killed in a summary execution format," stating that it is "too early" to call what happened a genocide.

American University professor of international law Rebecca Hamilton stated in April 2022 that "certainly every day there feels like there's more and more evidence coming out that might point in that direction." But the term "genocide" is often used by members of the public "to describe a situation that is horrendous, seems unimaginable when it seems that peaceful residents are killed only for the reason that they, in this case are Ukrainians." Hamilton stated that "the legal definition of genocide is very specific, and we have not yet reached the stage where enough evidence has been collected to make a legal assessment of whether genocide has taken place."  

Human rights law professor and former UN Special Adviser on the Prevention of Genocide, Juan E. Méndez, commented in April 2022: "I think this deserves an investigation. Of course, it would be a serious mistake to ignore the fact that many of the victims so far were clearly civilians, perhaps because they were Ukrainians – this is a national origin, a condition that fits into the partial definition of genocide ... But that the fact that civilians are killed is not necessarily genocide", although whether acts are war crimes, crimes against humanity, or genocide, "all three of them require the international community to investigate, prosecute and punish the perpetrators."

Jonathan Lieder Maynard, lecturer in international politics at King's College London, argued in April 2022 that the current evidence is too unclear to fit with the strict definition of the Genocide Convention. He noted: "Perhaps these atrocities could have been genocide or could develop into genocide in the future, but the evidence is still insufficient." At the same time, Maynard drew attention to the "deeply disturbing" rhetoric of the Russian president, who denied the historical existence of Ukraine as an independent state. According to him, this illustrates the "genocidal way of thinking" when Vladimir Putin believes that Ukraine "is fake, so it has no right to exist." Maynard did recognize that there was already a significant risk "that genocide may be imminent or already underway", and suggested that "the most viable strategy for halting atrocities by Russia’s troops is to help the Ukrainian army to push those troops out of Ukrainian territory". Maynard also pointed to the clearer evidence for the crime of incitement to genocide by Russia.

Director of the Center for the Study of Genocide and Human Rights at Rutgers University, Alexander Hinton, in an interview with the BBC stated on 13 April that "a lot [had] changed in [the previous] week" and that it was "quite likely" that Russian forces were carrying out genocide. Hinton stated that the genocidal rhetoric of Vladimir Putin would have to be clearly linked to the atrocities themselves in order to prove genocidal intent. In July Hinton pointed to mass deportations and forced transfer of children as evidence of Russian genocide in Ukraine, linking them to repeated genocides and other international crimes committed by Russia in the past.

Evidence of genocidal intent 

Scholars including Eugene Finkel and Timothy D. Snyder claimed that along with the acts required by the definition of genocide, there was genocidal intent, together establishing genocide.

On 5 April 2022, Holocaust scholar Eugene Finkel claimed that after the initial phase of the 2022 Russian invasion was resisted by Ukrainian armed forces, the aims of the invasion evolved. According to Finkel, the combined evidence of widespread war crimes, including the Bucha massacre, together with "abundant" evidence for genocidal intent, as illustrated by the essay What Russia should do with Ukraine published in RIA Novosti by Timofey Sergeytsev, established that genocide was taking place.

On 8 April 2022, historian of Central and Eastern Europe and the Holocaust, Timothy D. Snyder, described the What Russia should do with Ukraine essay as "an explicit program for the complete elimination of the Ukrainian nation as such". According to Snyder, Sergeytsev presents the Russian definition of "Nazi" as being "a Ukrainian who refuses to admit being a Russian", and any "affinity for Ukrainian culture or for the European Union" is seen as "Nazism".

Thus, per Snyder, the document defines Russians as not being Nazis, and justifies using the methods of fascism against Ukrainians while calling the methods "denazification". Snyder describes the document as "one of the most openly genocidal documents [that he had] ever seen", stating that the document calls for the majority of Ukrainians, twenty million people, to be killed or sent to labour camps. Snyder argues that Sergeytsev's document, published two days after information about the Bucha massacre became widely known, makes the establishment of genocidal intent much easier to prove legally than in other cases of mass killing. 

The Guardian described Russian media, including RIA Novosti, as encouraging genocide on the basis that Ukrainian resistance to the invasion was evidence of their Nazism. Snyder argued that an analysis of the statements by Vladimir Putin over several decades showed that Putin had long-standing genocidal intentions against Ukrainians. Snyder stated, "To see Putin's genocidal drive is to help some of us understand where this war came from, where it's going, and why it can't be lost."

Gregory Stanton, founder and head of Genocide Watch, told the BBC that there is evidence "that the Russian army actually intends to partially destroy the Ukrainian national group", which explains the killings of civilians in addition to combatants and the military. Commenting on Vladimir Putin's pre-invasion speech in which he declared that the eight-year War in Donbas looked like genocide, Stanton pointed to what some scholars call "mirroring", in which he says: "Often the perpetrator of a genocide accuses the other side – the targeted victims – of intending to commit genocide before the perpetrator does so. This is exactly what happened in this case."
The German newspaper Der Tagesspiegel published a legal opinion by lawyer Otto Luchterhandt, which refers to the blockade of Mariupol and numerous crimes of the Russian military from the point of view of international law, in particular, genocide. In an interview with Deutsche Welle regarding actions indicative of genocide, he stated:
 "The first is the encirclement of the city and the fact that since the beginning of March services from the Ukrainian side have not been allowed into the city to provide the population with food and the most necessary things for life. The population is cut off from water, electricity and heating, as well as mobile communications, which are the standard today, that is, people are cut off from communication with the outside world."
 "The second is the constant bombardment of residential areas and people, and especially medical, cultural and other institutions that have nothing to do with power or military facilities. The most egregious is indeed an attack on a children's hospital. Here, even Russian propaganda contradicted itself when at first it said that it was fake and it didn't exist at all, and then it said that the headquarters of the battalion, right-wing radicals and 'Nazis' were allegedly located there."
 "And from these objective facts, one can conclude that the subjective intention of the Russian troops or President Putin is to destroy, wipe the city and its population from the face of the earth. That is, the population is systematically destroyed, planned actions are being carried out, and not some random bombardments."
Regarding the fact that the term "genocide” implies the destruction of a certain ethnic group, he noted: "Yes, because we are talking about the community of the city of Mariupol as part of the Ukrainian population, that is, the Ukrainian national group. The crime refers to protection from actions to destroy not only the entire group, but also part of it."

Associate Professor of the Department of International Law of the Institute of International Relations of the Taras Shevchenko National University of Kyiv Zakhar Tropin, on his Facebook page said: "The terrible events in Bucha, Irpin and Hostomel (and in general in Ukraine) should be considered and mentioned in connection with the goals of the so-called "special operation" of the Russian Federation. The leadership of the aggressor spoke directly about this - the so-called "denazification". Considering what has been done, this is a direct call, planning and leadership of the genocide in Ukraine. The logic is simple: the events in Bucha, Irpin and Hostomel plus the purpose of the so-called "special operation", "denazification" = the crime of genocide."On 5 September 2022, Genocide Watch assessed that several stages of genocide existed in Ukraine – dehumanization (stage 4), persecution (8), extermination (9), and denial (10) – due to Russia's intentional massacres of Ukrainian civilians, forced deportations, torture, sexual violence, and hate speech to incite, justify, and deny genocide.

The risk of genocide and obligation to prevent 
The International Court of Justice in its February 2007 judgment regarding genocide in Bosnia and Herzegovina explained that "at the instant that the State learns of, or should normally have learned of, the existence of a serious risk that genocide will be committed", the Genocide Convention triggers the duty to prevent, requiring state parties to analyze the risk to inform their response. The court said the obligation "is one of conduct and not of result", requiring states to "employ all means reasonably available to them ... as far as possible" at the risk of being held responsible for failing to act. 

United Nations special adviser on the prevention of genocide Alice Nderitu briefed the UN Security Council in June 2022 on the legal obligation to prevent, acknowledging the 16 March order by the International Court of Justice indicating provisional measures in the case of Ukraine v. Russian Federation, requiring Russia to "immediately suspend the military operations". 

Azeem Ibrahim, director of special initiatives at the New Lines Institute said of the Genocide Convention, "to 'prevent' always comes first", and states that don't act before a court determines that genocide is occurring are "essentially obfuscating and avoiding their responsibility".

References

Further reading

External links 
 Peter Dickinson, "Vladimir Putin’s Ukrainian Genocide: Nobody can claim they did not know", The Atlantic Council, 1 December 2022
 Norman M. Naimark, "Ukraine and the Cloud of Genocide”, Hoover Institution, 10 May 2022.
 Marco Poggio, "Call It Genocide? The Debate over Labeling Ukraine Atrocities", Law360, 6 May 2022.
 Elizabeth Whatcott, "Compilation of Countries' Statements Calling Russian Actions in Ukraine 'Genocide'", Just Security, May 20, 2022.

 
Incitement to genocide
Massacres committed by Russia
Massacres in Ukraine
Massacres of Ukrainians
Russian war crimes in Ukraine
War crimes during the 2022 Russian invasion of Ukraine
Articles containing video clips
Genocides in Europe